Orla is an unincorporated community in southern Laclede County, in the Ozarks of southern Missouri. The community is located near the junction of Missouri Route 5 and Route O, east of the Osage Fork Gasconade River and approximately eleven miles south of Lebanon.

History
A post office called Orla was established in 1880, and remained in operation until 1954. The name Orla is said to be named after the son of an early settler.

References

Unincorporated communities in Laclede County, Missouri
Unincorporated communities in Missouri